Balsall Common Viaduct is a railway viaduct under construction in Balsall Common that will carry the High Speed 2 railway line.

It will be constructed from concrete and is designed to last for 120years. It will carry the railway line over Station Road, Bayleys Brook, the Heart of England Way, and the local floodplain.

References 

Railway bridges in the West Midlands (county)
High Speed 2
Buildings and structures in Solihull